Qezeljeh-ye Kharabeh (also Romanized as Qezeljeh-ye Kharābeh and Qezeljeh Kharābeh; also known as Qezeljeh-ye Zarīn and Qezeljeh) is a village in Baruq Rural District, in the Central District of Heris County, East Azerbaijan Province, Iran. At the 2006 census, its population was 100, in 24 families.

References 

Populated places in Heris County